Dan Walmsley is a Melbourne-based comedian, writer, musician and improvisor. He is also the creator of Planet Nerd, an RMITV show on Community station C31 Melbourne.

Dan studied Honours in Software Engineering at Monash University in Melbourne.  He was involved in performing acts of comedy and music from early on, and was performing on stage to audiences during his years at university.  Since then he has been involved in multifarious music and comedy projects, including the bands Jem and The Debacles (www.thedebacles.com), the comedy project 'Pink Horse of Whimsy' (pinkhorseofwhimsy.com), and performing improvised comedy at the Comic's Lounge in Melbourne.

His comedy style includes sharp-edge political satire, and nerdy surrealist.  His remarkably tall and gangly frame, 6'5" aids delivery of awkward physical jokes.

References

External links

Living people
Australian male comedians
RMITV alumni
Year of birth missing (living people)